KSAJ-FM (98.5 FM) is a radio station licensed to Burlingame, Kansas, United States. The station is currently owned by Alpha Media LLC,.

History
KSAJ-FM went on the air April 1, 1985, as a re-frequencied KABI-FM, and was licensed to Abilene, Kansas. The “SAJ” call letters stood for “Salina-Abilene-Junction City” – the primary cities of its coverage area.

KABI-FM was originally a 3,000-watt (ERP) Class A station at 98.3 MHz. The frequency change to 98.5 MHz was accompanied by an increase in power to 100,000 watts (ERP), and a physical move of the transmitter site from northwest Abilene to about 10 miles south of Abilene, east of K-15 on 1400 Avenue in rural Dickinson County.

Also on April 1, 1985, sister station KABI changed call letters and became KSAJ. The stations simulcast programming for about two years. In 1987, KSAJ returned to being KABI with separate programming, and KSAJ continued on as an FM-only radio station, carrying an oldies format. The station long carried ABC Radio Networks' "Good Time Oldies" satellite feed before switching to The True Oldies Channel, then switched back to Good Time Oldies in 2014.

In late 1991, KSAJ-FM and KABI were sold by broadcaster Norton Warner of Lincoln, Nebraska, to J.K. Vanier and Jerry Hinrikus of Salina, who later sold them to MCC Radio (Morris Communications) in January 2004. Then, on September 1, 2015, Alpha Media, LLC acquired the stations.

In October 2016, Alpha sold their Salina cluster (which KSAJ-FM was a part of) to Manhattan-based Rocking M Media. However, KSAJ-FM was retained by Alpha, who announced plans to move the station into the Topeka market (with the process beginning in the late 1990s) and join it with WIBW and WIBW-FM, and KTPK. In February 2017, after the closing of the Salina cluster's sale to Rocking M, Alpha moved the KSAJ-FM studios from Abilene to Topeka. Initially, the station planned to relocate their transmitter to the tower of WIBW-FM/TV, located west of Topeka in rural Wabaunsee County, and reduce their power output 69,000 watts. However, due to co-channel interference concerns with KQKQ-FM in the Omaha-Council Bluffs market, KSAJ-FM changed transmitter sites, first to the site of WIBW (and reduced power to 25,000 watts), and then to the KTWU-TV/KWIC/KTOP-FM tower in northwest Topeka, and reduced power even further to 17,500 watts.

At 6 p.m. on November 10, 2017, KSAJ-FM shut down its Dickinson County transmitter, signed on their new Topeka transmitter (with a new city of license of Burlingame), and began stunting with Christmas music as "Christmas 98.5." At midnight on December 26, KSAJ-FM debuted its new adult hits format as "98.5 Jack FM."

References

External links

SAJ-FM
Alpha Media radio stations
Adult hits radio stations in the United States
Jack FM stations
Radio stations established in 1968
1968 establishments in Kansas